Dörentrup is a municipality in the Lippe district of North Rhine-Westphalia, Germany. It has an area of 49.79 km² and c. 8,000 inhabitants (2013).

The name is derived from the Low German word for hill passes, Dören.

Night lighting scheme 
A remarkable feature in this village is its night lighting scheme. Every night at 11 pm, all street lights turn off. Inhabitants can then request that lights be turned back on as needed by sending a code to a special phone number called Dial4light. Each street has its own code that can be found either online on a specific website or on each light post. 
This is intended to reduce energy use, save money, respect the nocturnal fauna and avoid light pollution.

References

External links
 Official website 
 Dial4Light : http://www.travelbugholiday.com/?p=1672
 BBC video about Dial4Light : http://news.bbc.co.uk/2/hi/europe/7796800.stm

Towns in North Rhine-Westphalia
Lippe
Principality of Lippe